"Don't Waste My Time" is a song by Australian hard rock band the Angels, released in October 1986 as the second single  from their eighth studio album Howling. The song peaked at number 40 on the Kent Music Report and number 38 on the Recorded Music NZ chart.

Track listing 
7-inch single (Mushroom K80)
 Don't Waste My Time (Bob Spencer, Richard Brewster) - 3:54
 Hide Your Face (Richard Brewster) - 3:54
12-inch single
 Don't Waste My Time (Extended) (Bob Spencer, Richard Brewster) - 5:15
 Hide Your Face (Richard Brewster) - 3:54
 Don't Waste My Time (Bob Spencer, Richard Brewster) - 3:54

Personnel 
 Doc Neeson - lead vocals
 Rick Brewster - lead guitar, percussion
 Bob Spencer - rhythm guitar, backing vocals
 Jim Hilbun - bass guitar, sax, backing vocals, percussion
 Brent Eccles - drums
 Eddie Rayner - Keyboards
 Swami Brown - percussion
 Greg Thorne - Trumpet
 Tony Buchanan - Tenor and Bari Saxes
 Herbie Canon - Trombone
Production
 Steve Brown - Producer
 Andrew Scott - Engineer
 Al Wright - Engineer
 Heidi Cannova - Assistant Engineer
 Bill Price - Mixing
 Deitmar - Mixing Assistant

Charts

References 

The Angels (Australian band) songs
Mushroom Records singles
1986 singles
1986 songs